Namibiavis is an extinct genus of early hoatzin from early Middle Miocene (about 16 mya) deposits of Namibia. It was collected from Arrisdrift, southern Namibia. It was first named by Cécile Mourer-Chauviré in 2003 and the type species is Namibiavis senutae.

References

Opisthocomiformes
Cenozoic birds of Africa
Fossil taxa described in 2003
Birds described in 2003